Thaamirabharani is a 2007 Indian Tamil-language action drama film written and directed by Hari. The film has Vishal and newcomer Bhanu, while Prabhu, Nadhiya, Vijayakumar, Nassar and Ganja Karuppu play supporting roles. The score and soundtrack were composed by Yuvan Shankar Raja.

The title is derived from the river of the same name, which flows through Thirunelveli and Thoothukudi, where the film is set. Thaamirabharani was released on 14 January 2007 during Thai Pongal, eventually becoming a blockbuster at the box office and running for more than 150 days in theatres.

Plot
Saravana Perumal is a rich salt trader and iron businessman living in Thoothukudi. Subbayya, his son Vellathurai and his daughter Sakunthala Devi are from Tirunelveli, and are his arch rivals in business. Bharani Puthiran is Saravanan's nephew and heir, who has completed his graduation and always roams with his irresponsible friends. Bhanumathi is a college student in Bharani's alma mater, who meets and falls in love with him and keeps following him always. Bharani learns that Bhanu is Sakunthala Devi's daughter and suspects her behavior and hence does not reciprocate her love.

One day, Bhanu goes to meet Bharani in Mullaitivu island, in Sri Lanka and everyone gets arrested by the coastal guards mistaken for prostitution charges, and they later get released by the local police as Bharani is highly influential, but a press reporter writes about this event as he has a vengeance against Sakunthala Devi. This angers Subbayya and he misunderstands that Saravanan was the mastermind behind trapping Bhanu in prostitution case. Subbayya and his son Vellathurai plan to kill Saravanan, but he escapes. Bharani gets enraged knowing this and goes to kill Vellathurai, but he accidentally chops off the hand of Vellathurai's kindhearted younger brother Selvam. Bharani feels bad about his action.

Saravanan tells the truth to Bharani that Sakunthala Devi is none other than his estranged wife, and Bhanu is his own daughter. Sakunthala Devi didn't like Saravanan's widowed sister, and her son Bharani staying along with him as she wanted him to lead a nuclear family. This brought up a fight between Saravanan and Sakunthala Devi and she left to her father's place. Bharani realises his mistakes and understands that Bhanu intentionally tried marrying him so that there is a chance for the family getting united again. Bharani meets Bhanu and apologizes to her and both get closer again. Bharani eventually plans to get Sakunthala Devi and Saravanan reunited.

Meanwhile, Karmegam, who works for Vellathurai, expresses his interest to marry Sakunthala Devi with the plan of owning all her wealth. Vellathurai agrees without informing the plans for  the wedding. Bharani learns about this and rushes to stop the wedding. Sakunthala Devi gets shocked knowing her brother's pervert intention to get her married to Karmegam and scolds him. Quarrel erupts and Karmegam seemingly gets killed by Bharani following which Bharani is sent to prison. Sakunthala Devi realises her mistake and finally reunites with Saravanan. After 4 years, Bharani gets released from prison and returns home, to find the wedding arrangements are made between him and Bhanu.

Bharani refuses to marry Bhanu and says that Subbayya and Vellathurai are still angry at him for chopping off Selvam's hand, and Bharani insists that Bhanu marry Selvam instead. Finally Sakunthala Devi reveals the truth that it was she who killed Karmegam indeed, and Bharani took the blame and was imprisoned so that she can be saved. Subbayya and Vellathurai overhear the conversation and understand Bharani's good nature. Finally, Bharani and Bhanu get married, and the family reunites again.

Cast

Release
It was released on 14 January 2007 during Thai Pongal along with Vijay's Pokkiri and Ajith's Aalwar

Critical reception
Rediff wrote: "Hari has managed to put together a fairly redeemable mixture of action, humour and sentiments, making the movie worth a watch".
B Balaji wrote: "Thaamirabharani is all about conflicts. With a large number of characters on either side, two or more of them seem to be fighting, either verbally or physically, most of the time. Though this makes the movie quite loud, it also gives the movie a lot of energy".
Hindu wrote: "Hari has a few interesting twists and suspenseful sequences in the narration. The story is not new but it is gripping".

Soundtrack

The music was composed by Yuvan Shankar Raja, who teamed up with director Hari for the very first time but with Vishal for the third time after Sandakozhi (2005) and Thimiru (2006). The soundtrack was released on 22 December 2006. It features five tracks with lyrics penned by Na. Muthukumar and Hari. The song "Karuppana Kaiyale" was adapted from the old devotional song "Karpoora Nayagiye" by L. R. Eswari.

References

External links
 

2007 films
2007 action drama films
2000s masala films
Films directed by Hari (director)
Films scored by Yuvan Shankar Raja
2000s Tamil-language films
Indian action drama films
Films shot in Tamil Nadu
Films shot in Karaikudi
Films shot in Thoothukudi